Harold Hecht (1907–1985) was an Academy Award-winning Hollywood film producer, dance director and film director. He was also a talent agent, a literary agent, a theatrical producer, a theatre director and a Broadway actor. He was a member of the Academy of Motion Pictures Arts and Sciences and the Screen Producers Guild.

During his first stay in Hollywood in the early to mid-1930s, Hecht was one of the leading dance directors in the movie industry, working with the Marx Brothers, Mae West, Bing Crosby, Cary Grant, W.C. Fields, Gary Cooper, Maurice Chevalier and Marion Davies. In 1947, he co-founded Norma Productions, an independent film production company, with his business partner and managed actor, Burt Lancaster. From 1954 to 1959, the Norma Productions subsidiaries, Hecht-Lancaster Productions and Hecht-Hill-Lancaster Productions, were the biggest and most important independent production units in Hollywood. Following the end of the Hecht-Hill-Lancaster Productions team, Hecht continued as one of the top three independent producers in Hollywood, a position he shared with Stanley Kramer and the Mirisch brothers, for the next ten years.

At the 28th Academy Awards ceremony in 1956, Hecht received a Best Picture Oscar for the 1955 Hecht-Lancaster Productions film Marty. He was again nominated three years later at the 31st Academy Awards ceremony for the 1958 Hecht-Hill-Lancaster Productions film Separate Tables. The film did not win but Hecht did accept the Oscar for Best Supporting Actress in place of Wendy Hiller who could not be present. The Broadway play version of Separate Tables, produced by Hecht-Lancaster Productions, was nominated for the Best Play Award at the 11th Tony Awards ceremony in April 1957 In November 1959 Hecht was chosen by United States President Dwight Eisenhower to accompany the cultural exchange program committee in a trip to Russia when  Marty was selected by the USSR as the first American film to be screened in that country since World War II.

Fourteen of Hecht's film productions (and an additional three on which he was a choreographer) have won and been nominated for several awards and prizes at various ceremonies and film festivals, including; Academy Awards, Golden Globe Award, British Academy Film Awards, Bodil Awards, Directors Guild of America Award, Writers Guild of America Award, National Board of Review Awards, New York Film Critics Circle Award, Laurel Awards, David di Donatello Award, Bambi Award and the Online Film & Television Association Award; and at the Cannes Film Festival, the Venice Film Festival and the Berlin International Film Festival. Four of the films Harold Hecht worked on have been deemed "culturally, historically, or aesthetically significant" by the United States National Film Preservation Board and have been selected for preservation in the Library of Congress' National Film Registry; Duck Soup in 1990, Sweet Smell of Success in 1993,  Marty in 1994 and She Done Him Wrong in 1996.

As dance director or choreographer

As director

As producer

References

External links
 

Hecht, Harold
Films produced by Harold Hecht